2018 Moss Side mass shooting
2020 Moss Side shooting